Charles Boyle may refer to:

 Charles Boyle, 3rd Viscount Dungarvan (1639–1694), British politician 
 Charles Boyle, 2nd Earl of Burlington (died 1704), British politician
 Charles Boyle, 4th Earl of Orrery (1674–1731), author, soldier and statesman; namesake of the orrery
 Charles Boyle, 2nd Viscount Blesington (died 1732), Irish peer and member of the House of Lords
 Charles Boyle, 10th Earl of Cork (1861–1925), Irish soldier and peer
 Charles Boyle (poet) (born 1951), British poet
 Charles A. Boyle (1907–1959), U.S. Representative from Illinois
 Charles Cavendish Boyle (1849–1916), British colonial administrator
 Charles Edmund Boyle (1836–1888), U.S. Representative from Pennsylvania
 Charles J. Boyle (1877–1947), American football player and coach
 Charles P. Boyle (1892–1968), American cinematographer
 Charles Boyle (Brooklyn Nine-Nine), fictional character from American police television sitcom Brooklyn Nine-Nine
 Charles Boyle (horse trainer), (1838–1919) Canadian Hall of Fame horse trainer

See also
 Charles Boyle Roberts (1842–1899), U.S. congressman from Maine

de:Charles Boyle (Dichter)